The  is a small-sector private railway company operating a railway line in northern Saitama Prefecture, Japan. In addition to its railway operations, the company deals in the real estate and tourism industries. It managed the Mitsumine Ropeway (三峰ロープウェイ) until it closed in December 2007 and the Mikajiri Line until its closure in 2020.
Taiheiyo Cement is its largest shareholder, and one of Chichibu Railway's main operations is the transportation of limestone from Mount Bukō. The railway's passenger services concentrate on the tourism industry, as there are popular destinations along the line. A train hauled by a steam locomotive also operates regularly during some seasons, attracting tourists from around the country.

Lines

Railway lines 

Former Lines 
 Mikajiri Line (三ヶ尻線): from Takekawa Station to Kumagaya Kamotsu Terminal (freight line closed in 2020)

Aerial tramway lines 
 Mitsumine Ropeway at Mitsumineguchi (closed in December 2007)

History 
 8 November 1899 - Founded as Jōbu Railway (Headquartered in now-defunct Nihonbashi Ward, Tokyo City).
 7 October 1901 - Started operations between Kumagaya and Yorii.
 1916 - Company name changed to Chichibu Railway.
 1921 - Started operations between Hokubu Railway's Hanyu Station and Gyoda Station (now Gyodashi Station).
 1922 - Chichibu Railway acquired Hokubu Railway.
 1930 - Started operations on the full line between Hanyu and Mitsumineguchi.
 1954 - Started direct operations with the Tōbu Tōjō Line.
 1980 - Headquarters moved to Kumagaya, Saitama.
 1988 - Started operations of a steam locomotive-hauled train, the Paleo Express.
 1989 - Started direct operations with Seibu Railway.
 1997 - Moved bus operations to a separate entity, Chichibu Railway Sightseeing Bus Co., Ltd.
 12 March 2022 - Start of fare collection with PASMO transit smartcard.

See also
Hodosan Ropeway

References
This article incorporates material from the corresponding article in the Japanese Wikipedia.

External links
  

 
Railway companies of Japan
Companies based in Saitama Prefecture
Japanese companies established in 1899
Railway companies established in 1899